Ernst Damzog  (30 October 1882 – 24 July 1945) was a German policeman, who was a member of the SS of Nazi Germany and served in the Gestapo. He was responsible for the mass murder of Poles and Jews committed in the territory of occupied Poland during World War II.

Invasion of Poland
In September 1939, during the invasion of Poland, Damzog served as colonel (SS-Standartenführer) of Einsatzgruppe V (EG V-Allenstein), deployed with the 3rd Army (Wehrmacht) in Reichsgau Wartheland (Warthegau), which was carved out of the Polish lands annexed by Nazi Germany. He was responsible for the mass executions of Polish citizens following the victorious Battle of Grudziądz (Graudenz), practically eradicating the entire Jewish population of the town. He was also in control of the execution of medical patients in order to empty state hospitals, which he entrusted to his subordinate officer Herbert Lange. After the annexation of western Poland, Damzog served in occupied Poznań (Posen) as the police inspector for both Sicherheitspolizei (SiPo) and Sicherheitsdienst (SD), under the command of SS-Obergruppenführer Wilhelm Koppe sent to Posen on September 30, 1939.

While in Poznań, Damzog was actively involved in the mass expulsions of Poles from Reichsgau Wartheland to General Government. He personally selected staff for the killing centre in Chełmno extermination camp and supervised its daily operation. The first victims there came from the local villages, and the mass killings with the use of gas vans started on 8 December 1941. 

The murders at Chelmno were the precursor to the Final Solution, because the idea of systematic genocide by gassing the able-bodied was not yet fully explored. Damzog is said to have related his 'experiments' to both Wilhelm Koppe and Arthur Greiser.

Damzog was stationed in the Gau until 1945, and promoted to the rank of SS-Brigadeführer as well as Generalmajor in 1944 for his swift  and  police actions. Damzog was transferred back to Germany ahead of the Soviet offensive. He was killed in Halle, Saxony-Anhalt during the Allied military campaign of 1945.

See also
 Operation Tannenberg extermination action
 Intelligenzaktion targeting Polish elites
 German AB-Aktion in Poland, in spring and summer of 1940

References

Further reading
Michael Wildt: Generation des Unbedingten. Das Führungskorps des Reichssicherheitshauptamtes. Hamburger Edition HIS Verlagsgesellschaft mbH, 2002, 
Shlomo Aronson: Heydrich und die Anfänge des SD und der Gestapo. 1931-1935, S. 217.
Hansjürgen Koehler: Inside the Gestapo, 1940 S. 36.

1882 births
1945 deaths
Reich Security Main Office personnel
Gestapo personnel
Einsatzgruppen personnel
SS-Brigadeführer
People from Strasbourg
Date of death unknown
Holocaust perpetrators in Poland
Waffen-SS personnel killed in action